Callotrochus is an extinct genus of sea snails in the family Calliostomatidae.

References

Calliostomatidae
Monotypic gastropod genera